Martika Flieringa (born 17 November 1978) is a Dutch former cricketer who played as a wicket-keeper and right-handed batter. She appeared for Netherlands in four One Day Internationals, all on their 1998–99 tour of Sri Lanka. She scored eight runs as Netherlands failed to win any matches.

References

External links
 
 

1978 births
Living people
Sportspeople from Haarlem
Dutch women cricketers
Netherlands women One Day International cricketers
Wicket-keepers